The SNCF Class BB 300 was a class of 24 electric locomotives built between 1938 and 1939. Originally ordered by the Paris–Orleans/Midi railway as a development of the Midi Class E4700 for fast services from Paris to Bordeaux and Toulouse. As delivered they were numbered E 241–E 264. Under the 1950 renumbering scheme they became BB 301–BB 324. E 258 was destroyed in 1944 so never became BB 318. In 1949, 11 locomotives were leased to Nederlandse Spoorwegen, returning to SNCF in 1951.

The class was withdrawn in 1997 after nearly 60 years in service.

References

300
B-B locomotives
BB 300
Standard gauge locomotives of France

Passenger locomotives